FrackNation is a feature documentary created by Phelim McAleer and Ann McElhinney, the directors of Not Evil Just Wrong and Mine Your Own Business, and Magdalena Segieda, that aims to address misinformation about the process of hydraulic fracturing, commonly called fracking.

The film looks at the process of fracking for natural gas and seeks to address the concerns surrounding the process that were highlighted in the fracking-critical film Gasland. The film interviews many individuals directly affected by fracking, most of whom support the process.

Inspiration
FrackNation was inspired when documentary filmmaker Phelim McAleer asked Josh Fox, the director of the 2010 documentary Gasland, some questions at an event in Chicago. While Fox was promoting his film project McAleer confronted him about the historical records of people being able to ignite methane in water at "burning springs" long before fracking started. McAleer told the Los Angeles Times that Fox did not include that information in his film because he did not think it was relevant towards the current drilling impacts of certain areas.  The people interviewed in Fox's film claimed that the contamination was caused by the drilling.

After a video of the questioning was made public on various websites, Fox and his lawyers got the video removed from YouTube and Vimeo. However, FrackNation filmmakers managed to fight the removal and restore access to the video despite claims of infringing on HBO's copyrights.

McAleer told Politico he was motivated to make the film by what he saw as the "one-sided approach taken by the media, 'outsiders' and 'urban elites'" on the fracking process. McAleer said there has been no real debate on the issue, with the environmental lobby relying on emotion and scare tactics to condemn fracking.

In an interview with the Pittsburgh Post-Gazette McAleer stressed the film is trying to show both sides of the fracking discussion. "We're definitely covering the contamination" in the film, McAleer said. "We feature both sides."

Synopsis
Official synopsis: "In FrackNation journalist Phelim McAleer faces threats, cops, and bogus lawsuits questioning green extremists for the truth about fracking. McAleer uncovers fracking facts suppressed by environmental activists, and he talks with rural Americans whose livelihoods are at risk if fracking is banned."

The most impoverished communities across the United States have seen an unexpected revival. Shale gas, produced through a controversial method of hydraulic fracturing has created an economic boom, touching everyone, from farmers to small business owners to workers to ordinary residents. But when several of the landowners who leased their land for drilling sue  a gas company for making their water flammable, a movement of anti-fracking activists creates a political pressure that results in a series of bans and moratoria on fracking that put the development on hold.

In the film, farmers point out that without being able to lease a portion of their land for fracking, they would be forced to sell off the land to housing developers.

Reactions to the film
There were positive reviewers that regarded the film as well researched. Jeannette Catsoulis, a film reviewer for the New York Times, noted that the movie was methodically researched and showed the "sheer complexity" of fracking.  Variety said the film examined the process of fracking, giving counter arguments for the Gasland documentary, especially the flaming faucets scene. The magazine noted that the documentary did a thorough job of technical information and personal stories of farmers who live near fracking locations. The National Review noted that FrackNation did an excellent job refuting Gasland based upon the scientific research in the film.

Some positive reviews claimed that the film was able to successfully refute not only the factual claims of Gasland but also some of the emotional testimonies. Christopher Campbell, from  Movies.com, said the documentary was "surprisingly engaging" and that the most interesting case against Gasland that was brought up was the easy acceptance by journalists of the film as fact, implying journalists have ignored their responsibilities of fact-checking all documentaries. The review noted that because the film did not accept money from the energy industry it gave the film more credibility, though some of the donors were some of the farmers who were featured in the film. Kyle Smith for the New York Post wrote that McAleer should have earned an award for taking on the "fear mongering" in Gasland.

There were negative reviews of the film. Miriam Bale of the New York Daily News wrote, "With many of McAleer’s facts coming from casual Internet searches (backed by boring shots of the computer screen), the accuracy of this crowd-sourced documentary — funded by small donations on Kickstarter — seems as reliable as a Wikipedia entry." Mark Olsen of the LA Times criticized the film as "unfocused," with several moments that are "theatrical but irrelevant," calling the film "a one-sided attack piece" that "doesn't add much to the conversation."  John Anderson of Variety found the film's use of staged confrontations ineffective and manipulative, writing that "McAleer’s sandbagging of Carol Collier, executive director of the Delaware River Basin Commission, seems pointless, except as an effort to get an anti-fracking official to look like she’s got something to hide."

Funding
A public crowdfunding campaign was launched on Kickstarter on Feb. 6, 2012. FrackNation was featured as the most popular project in Kickstarter's film section. It reached the fundraising target of $150,000 within three weeks of launching.

The filmmakers offered an executive producer credit to anyone who supports the project. FrackNation has 3,305 executive producers. The average individual pledge to the film was $60.

McAleer and McElhinney claimed to have returned all funds raised from companies or senior executives in the gas industry, according to Valerie Richardson of the Colorado Observer.

However, the independence of special interests in the film's funding has been questioned. Erich Schwartzel of the Pittsburgh Post-Gazette reported that, "The filmmakers want to avoid their work being labeled as pro-industry propaganda, but support for the project has been strongest among those who want to see just that. The team's Kickstarter campaign... has been promoted by pro-industry lobbying groups Energy in Depth and the Marcellus Shale Coalition."

Release status

Theatrical

FrackNation had a theatrical premiere in New York on January 7 and in Los Angeles on January 11, 2013.

Television

On December 17, 2012 Mark Cuban's AXS.tv announced that they had acquired the television rights to FrackNation, and the documentary had its television premiere on January 22, 2013 at 9 p.m. EDT. AXS.tv timed the debut to coincide with the theatrical release of Promised Land, Matt Damon and John Krasinski's feature film about how the fracking debate affects a rural town.

Cuban says he welcomes the controversy and discussion, and the release of FrackNation should only fuel the fracking debate. “Of course the timing is relevant,” Cuban told The Hollywood Reporter. “We want people talking and using #AXSTV when they watch and discuss it.”

International Monetary Fund
Phelim McAleer accused the International Monetary Fund (IMF) of censorship when the organization invited him to speak at a two-day joint IMF-Oxford University conference on commodity prices in Washington, D.C. but refused to show a clip of FrackNation that suggests fracking would ease dependence on imports in some Eastern European countries. McAleer accused IMF of being afraid of offending Russia and therefore censoring his right to free speech. IMF insisted that it would not air the clip without allowing a rebuttal, which wasn't possible during the event. As a result of this, McAleer withdrew from the event.

United States Congressional Committee
The movie was shown to the House Committee on Science, Space, and Technology, Subcommittee on Environment in February 2013.

European Parliament
On February 10, 2014 the movie was shown in the European Parliament. This was the Europe-wide premiere with attendance of the movie director Phelim McAleer organized by YoungPetro a Petroleum Magazine.

See also
Not Evil Just Wrong
Mine Your Own Business
Frackman

References

External links
 
 FrackNation at Magnet Releasing
 
 
 APM Productions
 FrackNation on Facebook

2013 films
2013 documentary films
American documentary films
Documentary films about hydraulic fracturing
Environmental issues in the United States
Films set in Pennsylvania
Kickstarter-funded documentaries
2010s English-language films
2010s American films